Digimon Ghost Game is a Japanese anime and ninth incarnation of the Digimon franchise. The anime adaptation of the series began airing on Fuji TV in Japan on October 3, 2021, replacing Digimon Adventure: in the same timeslot. The opening theme is "FACTION" by Wienners. The first ending theme from episodes 1 to 12 is "Pedal" by Aiiro Apollo. The second ending theme from episodes 13 to 21 is "Datte Kyou made Koiwazurai" by BMK. The third ending theme from episodes 22 to 31 is "Hikari Au Mono Tachi" by Bye-Bye-Hand no Houteisiki. The fourth ending theme from episodes 32 to 44 is "Monster Disco" by Shikao Suga×Hyadain. The fifth ending theme from episodes 45 to 57 is "STRAWBERRY" by kobore. The sixth ending theme from episodes 58 onwards is "Take Me Maybe" by Penthouse.

Digimon Ghost Game is distributed simultaneously by Crunchyroll in North America, Central America, South America, Europe, Africa, Oceania, the MENA and CIS zones with English, Spanish, French, Portuguese, Arabic, Italian, German and Russian subtitles.

On April 6, 2022, Toei Animation announced that new episodes would be airing on April 17.


Episode list

Notes

References 

Digimon Ghost Game
2021 Japanese television seasons
2022 Japanese television seasons
2023 Japanese television seasons
Ghost Game